Wang Yeong may refer to:

Duke Nakrang (1043–1112), Goryeo royalty
Count Gonghwa (1126–1186), Goryeo royalty
Huijong of Goryeo (1181–1237), Goryeo king